Shinobu Asagoe and Katarina Srebotnik were the defending champions. Asagoe had retired in 2006.

Srebotnik partnered with Mara Santangelo, successfully defending her title. They beat the Spanish couple Anabel Medina Garrigues and Virginia Ruano Pascual in the final, 6–3, 7–6.

Seeds

Draw

External links
 ITF tournament edition details

Doubles
Bausch and Lomb Championships